Pure inductive logic (PIL) is the area of mathematical logic concerned with the philosophical and mathematical foundations of probabilistic inductive reasoning. It combines classical predicate logic and probability theory (Bayesian inference). Probability values are assigned to sentences of a first-order relational language to represent degrees of belief that should be held by a rational agent. Conditional probability values represent degrees of belief based on the assumption of some received evidence.

PIL studies prior probability functions on the set of sentences and evaluates the rationality of such prior probability functions 
through principles that such functions should arguably satisfy. Each of the principles directs the function to assign probability values and conditional probability values to sentences in some respect rationally.  Not all desirable principles of PIL are compatible, so no prior probability function exists that satisfies them all. Some prior probability functions however are distinguished through satisfying an important collection of principles.

History
Inductive logic started to take a clearer shape in the early 20th century in the work of William Ernest Johnson and John Maynard Keynes, and was further developed by Rudolf Carnap.  Carnap introduced the distinction between pure and applied inductive logic, and the modern Pure Inductive Logic evolves along the lines of the pure, uninterpreted approach envisaged by Carnap.

Framework

General case
In its basic form, PIL uses first-order logic without equality, with the usual connectives  (and, or, not and implies respectively), quantifiers  finitely many predicate (relation) symbols, and countably many constant symbols .

There are no function symbols. The predicate symbols can be unary, binary or of higher arities. The finite set of predicate symbols may vary while the rest of the language is fixed.

where the  list the predicate symbols.
The set of all sentences is denoted . If a sentence is written with constants appearing in it listed then it is assumed that the list includes at least all those that appear.

– any logically valid sentence  has probability  

This last condition, which goes beyond the standard Kolmogorov axioms (for finite additivity) is referred to as Gaifman's Axiom and it is intended to capture the idea that the  exhaust the universe.

Unlike belief functions in many valued logics, it is not the case that the probability value of a compound sentence is determined by the probability values of its components. Probability respects the classical semantics: logically equivalent sentences must be given the same probability. Hence logically equivalent sentences are often identified.

A state description for a finite set of constants is a conjunction of atomic sentences (predicates or their negations) instantiated exclusively by these constants, such that for any eligible atomic sentence either it or its negation (but not both) appears in the conjunction.

Any probability function is uniquely determined by its values on state descriptions.

Unary case
In the special case of Unary PIL, all the predicates  are unary. Formulae of the form 
 
where  

A state description specifies an atom for each constant involved in it, and it can be written as a conjunction of these atoms instantiated by the corresponding constants. Two constants are indistinguishable in the state description if it specifies the same atom for both of them.

Central question
Assume a rational agent inhabits a structure in  but knows nothing about which one it is. What probability function

should s/he adopt when  is to represent his/her degree of belief that a sentence  is true in this ambient structure?

Rational principles

General rational principles

The constant exchangeability principle, Ex.

The principle of predicate exchangeability, Px.
If  are predicates of the same arity then
for a sentence ,

The strong negation principle, SN.
For a predicate  and sentence ,

The principle of regularity, Reg.
If a quantifier-free sentence  is satisfiable then .
 
The principle of super regularity (universal certainty), SReg.
If a sentence  is satisfiable then .

The constant irrelevance principle, IP.
If sentences  have no constants in common then
.

The weak irrelevance principle, WIP.
If sentences  have no constants nor predicates in common then
.

Language invariance principle, Li.
There is a family of probability functions
, one on each
language , all satisfying Px and Ex, and such that  and
if all predicates of  belong also to  then  and  agree on sentences of .The (strong) counterpart principle, CP.
constant/relation symbols of the same arity not occurring in  thenThe Invariance Principle, INV.
 just when  
then .The Permutation Invariance Principle, PIP. As INV except that  is additionally required to map (equivalence classes of) state descriptions to (equivalence classes of) state descriptions.The Spectrum Exchangeability Principle, Sx. Let ,  be state descriptions extending  to include (just) . If  is -equivalent to some and at least as many constants as it is -equivalent to then .

Further rational principles for unary PIL The Principle of Instantial Relevance, PIR.

Let  for  be an infinite sequence of
atoms and  an atom.

and the proportion of occurrences of  amongst the  tends to .Principle of Induction for Unary languages, UPI. Whenever 
is a state description then there is another state description
 such that  and for any quantifier-free sentence ,Unary Language Invariance Principle, ULi. As Li, but with the languages restricted to the unary ones.ULi with Ax. As ULi but with all the probability functions in the family also satisfying Atom Exchangeability.

Relationships between principles
General Case
Sx implies Ex, Px and SN.

PIP + Ex implies Sx.

INV implies PIP and Ex. 
 
Li implies CP and SCP.

Li with Sx implies PI.

Unary case 
Ex implies PIR.

Ax is equivalent to PIP.

Ax+Ex implies UPI.

Ax+Ex is equivalent to Sx.

ULi with Ax implies Li with Sx.

Important probability functions
General probability functionsFunctions .  For a given structure  and ,Functions .For a given state description ,  is defined via specifying its values for state descriptions as follows.
As above but employing a non-standard universe (starting with a possibly non-standard state description ) to obtain the standard .

 The  are the only probability functions that satisfy Ex and IP.Functions .  For a given infinite sequence 

of non-negative real numbers such that 
 is defined via specifying its values for state descriptions as follows:

For  a sequence  of natural numbers 
and a state description ,  is consistent with 

 
 The  are the only probability functions that satisfy WIP and Li with Sx.  (The language invariant family witnessing Li with Sx consists of the functions  with fixed , where  is as  but defined with language .)

Further probability functions (unary PIL)Functions .  For a vector  of non-negative real numbers summing to one,  is defined via specifying its values for state descriptions as follows:

where  the is number of constants for which  specifies .

 
The  are the only probability functions that satisfy Ex and IP (they are also expressible as  ).Carnap continuum functions  For , the probability function  is uniquely determined by the values

 The  are the only probability functions that satisfy Ex and JSP.

  They also satisfy Li – the functions  with fixed , where  is as  but defined with language  provide the unary language-invariant family members.Functions .

and as such they satisfy Li.

 The  are the only functions that satisfy GPIR, Ex, Ax and Reg.

Representation theorems

A representation theorem for a class of probability functions provides means of expressing every probability function in the class
in terms of generic, relatively simple probability functions from the same class.Representation Theorem for all probability functions. Every probability function  for  can be represented as 
 
where  is a -additive measure on the -algebra of subsets of  generated by the sets Representation Theorem for Ex (employing non-standard analysis and Loeb Integration Theory). Every probability function  for  satisfying Ex can be represented as

Every probability function  for  satisfying Li with Sx can be represented as

where  is the set of sequences 

In the unary case (where  is a language containing  unary predicates), the representation theorem for Ex is equivalent to:

Every probability function  for  satisfying Ex can be represented as 

where

Notes

References
 Jeff Paris, Alena Vencovská (2015).  Pure Inductive Logic, Cambridge University Press.
 Jeff Paris (2010). Guangzhou Winter School Course on Pure Inductive Logic (PDF).
 Jeff Paris (2012). Munich Formal Epistemology Workshop Slides (PDF).
 Alena Vencovská (2017).  Prague Pure Inductive Logic Course Notes'' (PDF), with exercises.

Mathematical logic